The 2012 Stephen F. Austin Lumberjacks football team represented Stephen F. Austin State University in the 2012 NCAA Division I FCS football season. The Lumberjacks were led by sixth-year head coach J. C. Harper and played their home games at Homer Bryce Stadium. They were a member of the Southland Conference. They finished the season 5–6, 4–3 in Southland play to finish in a tie for fourth place.

Stephen F. Austin Radio Network
All Lumberjacks games will air on KTBQ 107.7 FM and can be listened to online.

Before the season

CFPA nominees
Senior wide outs Gralyn Crawford and Cordell Roberson were both named to the 2012 College Football Performance Awards (CFPA) watch list. Senior quarterback Brady Attaway was also named to the watch list.

2012 recruits

Roster

Schedule

Game summaries

Southwestern Oklahoma State
Sources:

The Lumberjacks open the season with their lone non-conference home game against the Division II Bulldogs. This will be the first ever meeting between Stephen F. Austin and Southwestern Oklahoma State.

SMU

The Mustangs and Lumberjacks meet each other for the second time in school history. In the previous match, in 2009, SMU managed to sneak away with a 31–23 win.

Sources:

Montana State

The only FCS tuneup before SLC play starts takes place between Montana State and the Lumberjacks. The 2012 meeting will be the fifth meeting between the two squads with Montana State holding a 3–1 advantage.

Sources:

Texas State

The team that has typically handled the Lumberjacks the easiest is the Bobcats. Stephen F. Austin enters the 2012 contest with a 29-56-1 record against Texas State. The Bobcats have won 5 contests in a row and 7 of the last 8 against the Lumberjacks.

Sources:

Central Arkansas

The Bears and Lumberjacks open SLC play for the sixth consecutive year with the Bears holding a slim 4–2 advantage over the Lumberjacks. After losing in 2011, the Lumberjacks will attempt to win their third game in 4 years against the Bears.

Sources:

Sam Houston State

The Battle of the Piney Woods returns to Reliant Stadium for a third consecutive season. The Lumberjacks will try to end a 1-game losing streak against the Bearkats and cut into the deficit record they have against the Bearkats of 35-49-2.

Sources:

Nicholls State

The Lumberjacks have had their most success in the SLC against the Colonels. The 29th meeting finds the Lumberjacks 21–7 against the Colonels, having won 4 straight and 6 of the past 7. That lone set back was by 1 point in 2007 (17-16).

Sources:

McNeese State

This 2012 contest returns to Lake Charles where the Lumberjacks are 7–7 against the Cowboys. Overall this will be the 32nd meeting between the two schools. The Cowboys lead the overall series 16-13-2, but the Lumberjacks have won the past 3 meetings.

Sources:

Lamar

The Lumberjacks have won four consecutive against the Cardinals and five of the last six meetings, but overall they trail the series 10-18-2.

Sources:

Southeastern Louisiana

The Lumberjacks final road game finds them trying to build on their recent dominance of the Lions. The Lumberjacks have won four in a row in the series and five of the past six. Overall, the Lumberjacks lead the series 9-5-1.

Sources:

Northwestern State

The Lumberjacks end the regular season at home as they try for their fourth consecutive win over the Demons in the annual Battle for Chief Caddo. Overall, the Demons lead the series against the Lumberjacks 42-23-3.

Sources:

Ranking movements

References

Stephen F. Austin
Stephen F. Austin Lumberjacks football seasons
Stephen F. Austin Lumberjacks football